Pilar de la Horadada is a town and district in the Province of Alicante, in the southeast of Spain. Located 66 km south of Alicante, the city is the southernmost of the Valencian Community, only 1 km north of the regional border (with the Province of Murcia).

The town and its neighbouring villages (Pinar de Campoverde and Torre de la Horadada) are home to thousands of British, German and northern European expatriates. San Javier Airport (Murcia) is within close proximity.

Geography and Ecology
The district boasts great ecological value, with an abundance of hawthorn, globularia, mastic, Kermes Oak and chamaerops.

There are many birds of prey to be found in the region, such as peregrine falcons, golden eagles, European sparrowhawks and kestrels.

Monuments and interesting places

 Parish Church of "Nuestra Señora del Pilar", in the centre of the town. It was built in 1986 on the same site as its predecessor. The bell tower of the original structure stands to this day. Its advocation is to the Blessed Virgin (Virgen del Pilar). In the building there are many examples of religious art, especially works from the local artists José María Sánchez Lozano and Manuel Ribera Girona.

 Watch Tower (16th century), built in 1591 to protect inhabitants of the town against the Mediterranean pirates. It is situated on the beach, in the nearby village of Torre de la Horadada.
 Río Seco in Pinar de Campoverde: a local river without water for the most of the year. The area is home to a lot of native animals and plants.
 Protected Zone of Sierra Escalona: protected in order to preserve native animals, particularly the birds.
 Archaeological ruins of : an old Roman town on the Vía Augusta, the main route between Illici (Elche) and Carthago Nova (Cartagena), two of the most important Roman cities in Spain.
 Archaeological – Ethnological Museum
 Remains of a Roman quarry on the Mil Palmeras beach
 The beaches of Pilar de la Horadada are spread along five kilometres. They are long with fine and white sand. These beaches are relatively safe places and swimming is permitted in mild conditions. Under the sea, one can see the marine biodiversity and the poseidonia. The quality of these beaches is demonstrated with their Blue Flags. Las Higuericas and Mil Palmeras are two of the most popular beaches in the district.

Festivals
 Festivals in honour of the Blessed Virgin: from 29 September until 30 October. The Floral Tribute (11 October) is one of the highlights alongside the 12th with the Solemn Mass, the procession and "Las carrozas" (one week later).
 Summer festivals: 30 July – Independence from the Orihuela Council (1986).

History

The town has been the site of many battles because of its location at the historical frontier between two kingdoms: the Kingdom of Murcia (Castilla) and the Kingdom of Valencia. Pilar de la Horadada was a town with dry farms and few houses known as Campo de la Horadada. After various centuries of agricultural economy, its tourism breakthrough came with its independence from the Orihuela municipal district in 1986. Co-operative societies such as 'Surinver' and 'Teresa Hermanos' use many of the local fields for vegetable growing. Pilar de la Horadada lies between the sea and the mountains and has a Mediterranean climate.

Sports
Unión Deportiva Horadada is a football club in Pilar de la Horadada.

References

External links
 Official Site
 History of Pilar de la Horadada
 The Roman Quarry at Mil Palmeras beach. Pilar de la Horadada was once a Roman settlement called Thiar

Municipalities in the Province of Alicante